Balala the Fairies: Princess Camellia is a 2015 Chinese fantasy adventure film directed by Chen Cheng and starring Zhao Yue and Dai Meng of SNH48, Zhao Jinmai, Daisy Waite and Xinel Simpson. It's the third film in the Balala the Fairies film series, following 2014's Balala the Fairies: The Magic Trial. It was released in China on October 1, 2015.

Plot
In the kingdom of Boka Boka, lives Princess Camellia, who can speak to magical creatures. One day, she loses control of three such creatures, causing them to flee. She sets on a quest to find them and lands on Earth.

Meanwhile, human sisters Maggie and Michelle are eager to see SNH48 live, but their fairy caretaker Shirley doesn't agree. They find Camellia, and together with her and fellow Princess Emma of Gemini, they set off to the magical creatures.

Cast
Zhao Yue as Camellia
Dai Meng as Sally
Zhao Jinmai as Maggie
Daisy Waite as Michelle
Xinel Simpson as Emma/Beibei

Reception
The film grossed  at the Chinese box office.

References

External links

Chinese animated fantasy films
2010s fantasy adventure films
Chinese fantasy adventure films
Magical girl films
2010s Mandarin-language films